Lutak (Lingít: Lḵoot) is a census-designated place (CDP) in Haines Borough, Alaska, United States. The population was 49 at the 2010 census, up from 39 in 2000.

Geography
Lutak is located at  (59.330461, -135.626107) in northern Haines Borough. The CDP surrounds the Lutak Inlet, an arm of the Chilkoot Inlet. It is bordered to the south by the Haines CDP, to the east by the Ferebee River, and to the west by the crest of the Takshanuk Mountains. The Lutak CDP surrounds the valley of the Chilkoot River and Chilkoot Lake. A single road (Lutak Road) leads  from the mouth of Chilkoot Lake southeast along the south side of Lutak Inlet and the west side of Chilkoot Inlet to Haines.

Demographics

Lutak first reported on the 1990 U.S. Census as a census-designated place (CDP). Within Lutak was the former Tlingit village of Chilkoot.

As of the census of 2000, there were 39 people, 19 households, and 12 families residing in the CDP. The population density was 0.3 people per square mile (0.1/km2). There were 39 housing units at an average density of 0.3/sq mi (0.1/km2). The racial makeup of the CDP was 89.74% White, 7.69% Native American, and 2.56% from two or more races. 2.56% of the population were Hispanic or Latino of any race.

There were 19 households, out of which 21.1% had children under the age of 18 living with them, 57.9% were married couples living together, and 31.6% were non-families. 26.3% of all households were made up of individuals, and 5.3% had someone living alone who was 65 years of age or older. The average household size was 2.05 and the average family size was 2.46.

In the CDP, the population was spread out, with 15.4% under the age of 18, 2.6% from 18 to 24, 30.8% from 25 to 44, 41.0% from 45 to 64, and 10.3% who were 65 years of age or older. The median age was 45 years. For every 100 females, there were 143.8 males. For every 100 females age 18 and over, there were 175.0 males.

The median income for a household in the CDP was $61,250, and the median income for a family was $26,250. Males had a median income of $80,488 versus $50,000 for females. The per capita income for the CDP was $20,928. There were no families and none of the population living below the poverty line, including no under eighteens and none of those over 64.

References

Census-designated places in Alaska
Census-designated places in Haines Borough, Alaska
Populated coastal places in Alaska on the Pacific Ocean